Campbell Creek is a locality in the North Burnett Region, Queensland, Australia.

Geography 
The locality takes its name from the Campbell Creek watercourse which has its source is more mountainous area (up to ) in the south of the locality and flows northward toward the lower flatter land (  in the north of the locality. Barambah Creek forms the north-western boundary of the suburb and the two creeks have their confluence on the locality's northern boundary. A short segment of the Burnett Highway forms part of the locality's northern boundary.

References 

North Burnett Region
Localities in Queensland